M. K. Kannan (born 29 December 1948) is an Indian politician and leader of the Communist Party of India (Marxist). He was the former general secretary of Communist Marxist Party. He represented Thrissur constituency in the Kerala Legislative Assembly from 1980 to 1982. He is the first Vice president of Kerala Bank.

References

1948 births
Living people
Kerala politicians
Communist Marxist Party politicians
Communist Party of India (Marxist) politicians from Kerala